The Chennai Central–Bengaluru City line (Officially known as Puratchi Thalaivar Dr. M.G. Ramachandran Central Railway Station–Krantivira Sangolli Rayanna - Bengaluru Station line) is an electrified railway double line which connects Chennai and Bangalore, the two largest cities in South India.

History
The first train service in southern India and the third in India was operated by Madras Railway from Royapuram / Veyasarapady to Wallajah Road (Arcot) in 1856. Madras Railway extended its trunk route to  Beypur / Kadalundi (near Calicut) in 1861. Madras Railway connected Bangalore Cantonment to Jolarpettai on the newly constructed Beypur line in 1864. Bangalore Mail started running the same year. Bangalore City was linked to Bangalore Cantonment in 1882. The -wide  broad gauge Bangarpet-Marikuppam line came up in 1894. The -wide narrow-gauge line between Bowringpet (later Bangarpet) and Kolar was opened in 1913 by Mysore State Railway. The narrow-gauge Yeshvantapur–Yelahanka–Devanahalli–Chikkaballapur–Kolar line was opened in 1915 and was linked to Bangalore in 1918. With the completion of the gauge conversion to broad gauge of the Chikballapur-Kolar section in November 2013, the entire Bangalore–Kolar section was ready for direct broad gauge trains. Gauge conversion of the Bangarpet–Kolar line was completed in 1997 and a Railbus service was operating since then, till 11 September 2016 when Railbus got replaced by an eight-bogie diesel–electric multiple unit (DEMU).

The Chennai–Trivellur sector was electrified in 1979–80, the Trivellur–Arakkonam–Chitteri sector in 1982–83, the Chitteri–Walajah Road (excl) sector in 1983–84, the Wallajah Road–Katpadi sector in 1984–85, the Katpadi–Jolerapettai sector in 1985–86, the Jolerapettai–Mulanur sector in 1990–91, the Mulanur–Bangarpet–Bangalore City sector in 1991–92.

In the early 1950s legislation was passed authorizing the central government to take over independent railway systems that were there. On 14 April 1951 the Madras and Southern Mahratta Railway, the South Indian Railway Company and Mysore State Railway were merged to form Southern Railway. Subsequently, Nizam's Guaranteed State Railway was also merged into Southern Railway. On 2 October 1966, the Secunderabad, Solapur, Hubli and Vijayawada Divisions, covering the former territories of Nizam's Guaranteed State Railway and certain portions of Madras and Southern Mahratta Railway were separated from Southern Railway to form the South Central Railway.  In 1977, Guntakal division of Southern Railway was transferred to South Central Railway and the Solapur division transferred to Central Railway. Amongst the seven new zones created in 2003 was South Western Railway, which was carved out of Southern Railway and South Central railway.

Chennai suburban services
EMU trains are operated between Puratchi Thalaivar Dr. M.G. Ramachandran Central railway station and Arakkonam Junction via West Line. As of 2005, 200,000 passengers daily used the EMU services in this sector.

Speed limit
–Arakkonam–Jolarpettai– is classified as a "Group B" line and can take speeds up to 110 km/h.

Sheds and workshops
Arakkonam earlier had a steam loco shed, now has an electric loco shed that holds 230+ locos, which include WAP-1 WAP-4 WAG-7,WAM-4 and WAG-5 locomotives.

Krishnarajapuram diesel loco shed, opened in 1983, can hold 125 locomotives. These include: WDS-6, WDM-2, WDM-3A, WDP-4, WDG-3A, WDG-4. It has also recently been housing 5 WAP-7 locomotives transferred from Royapuram shed, as a part of the conversion to a diesel and electric loco shed.

Jolarpettai has an electric/ diesel trip shed.

The Carriage and Wagon Workshops at Perambur repairs coaches and wagons. The Locomotive Workshops at Perambur was the premier broad-gauge steam loco repair shop in the south. Even now performs the annual overhaul of the Fairy Queen. The workshop now primarily handles the repair and maintenance of electric locomotives from all over the south and even beyond.

Basin Bridge has a carriage maintenance works. Avadi has a broad-gauge EMU maintenance and car shed. Arakkonam has engineering workshops.

Passenger movement

References

External links

5 ft 6 in gauge railways in India
Rail transport in Tamil Nadu
Rail transport in Andhra Pradesh
Rail transport in Karnataka

Transport in Bangalore
Transport in Chennai